Andrzej Trzebski (2 February 1928 – 5 July 2017) was a Polish physiologist and neurophysiologist. Since 1971 professor in Medical University of Warsaw. A member of: Warsaw Scientific Society (since 1981), Polish Academy of Sciences (1983) and Polish Academy of Learning (since 1990). Doctor honoris causa of Jagiellonian University.

He was decorated with a Gold Cross of Merit (1971), a Knight's Cross of Polonia Restituta (1981) and a Commander's Cross of Polonia Restituta (1998).

He died on 5 July 2017 at the age of 89 in Warsaw.

References 

1928 births
2017 deaths
Members of the Polish Academy of Sciences
Members of the Polish Academy of Learning
Polish physiologists
Recipients of the Order of Polonia Restituta